The Ayacara Formation is a sedimentary formation made up of interbedded sand and siltstone cropping out around Hornopirén and Ayacara Peninsula in western Los Lagos Region, Chile. Less common rocks are tuff and conglomerate. The formation dates to the Early and Middle Miocene (no earlier than 21.8–17.6 million years ago) when it deposited during a marine transgression.

See also 
 Geology of Chile
 Chaicayán Group
 La Cascada Formation
 Puduhuapi Formation
 Vargas Formation

References 

Geologic formations of Chile
Miocene Series of South America
Aquitanian (stage)
Burdigalian
Langhian
Serravallian
Neogene Chile
Sandstone formations
Siltstone formations
Conglomerate formations
Tuff formations
Geology of Los Lagos Region